Glory Akumbu Ogbonna (born 25 December 1998) is a Nigerian footballer who plays as a defender for the Turkish club ALG Spor and the Nigeria women's national team. She has formerly played with Edo Queens in the Nigeria Women Football League.

Club career 
On 16 July 2021, while in Austria with the rest of Super Falcons of Nigeria in camp for Aisha Buhari's invitational tournament, a Umeå-based professional association football club that plays in Elitettan, the second tier of women's football in Sweden club, Umeå IK announced the capturing of Glory as their new player until the end of the 2022 season.

After playing in Sweden, the left-back moved to Turkey and signed with the Gaziantep-based league champion club ALG Spor on 13 August 2022. On 18 August 2022, she debuted in the 2022–23 UEFA Women's Champions League.

International career 
At junior level, Ogbonna represented Nigeria at FIFA U-20 Women's World Cup in 2016 and 2018.

At the 2018 WAFU Women's Cup, Nigerian head coach, Thomas Dennerby stated that he was most impressed by the performance of Ogbonna after the competition. After her debut for the senior team at the tournament, she was invited for 2018 Africa Women Cup of Nations qualifiers, and subsequently making the squad to the main tournament.

References 

1998 births
Living people
Nigerian women's footballers
Nigeria women's international footballers
Women's association football defenders
Ibom Angels F.C. players
Edo Queens F.C. players
Nigerian expatriate sportspeople in Sweden
Expatriate women's footballers in Sweden
Nigerian expatriate sportspeople in Turkey
Expatriate women's footballers in Turkey
Turkish Women's Football Super League players
ALG Spor players